Marcy or Marcie may refer to:

People

Surname
Alfred Marcy (1900–1977), U.S. Army colonel
Elizabeth Eunice Marcy (1821–1911), American author, activist, and social reformer; wife of Oliver March
Florent Marcie, French documentary filmmaker, war reporter and journalist
Geoffrey Marcy (born 1954), American astronomer
Oliver Marcy (1820–1899), professor and administrator at Northwestern University; husband of Elizabeth Eunice Marcy
Pat Marcy (1913–1993), American mobster and politician
Randolph B. Marcy (1812–1887), U.S. Army officer and explorer
William L. Marcy (1786–1857), American lawyer, politician and judge 
The Marcy Brothers, American country music trio Kevin, Kris and Kendal Marcy

Given name
Marcie Blane (born 1944), American singer
Marcie Bolen (born 1977), American guitarist, a founding member of The Von Bondies
Marcy Conrad (1967–1981), American murder victim
Marcie Dodd (born 1978), American stage actress and singer
Marcie Free (born 1954), American rock singer
Marcy Harriell, American actress, singer and writer
Marcy Kaptur (born 1946), American politician
Marcy Hinzmann (born 1982), American figure skater
Marcy Teodoro (born 1970), Filipino politician and current mayor of Marikina
Marcy Toepel (born 1958), 21st century American politician
Marcy Towns, American chemist
Marcy Walker (born 1961), American actress

Other
Sam Marcy, pen name of American Marxist and co-founder of Workers World Party Sam Ballan (1911–1998)
Masashi Tashiro (born 1956), former Japanese TV performer's nickname

Fictional characters
Marcy (American Horror Story), in the television anthology series American Horror Story
Marcy (Chrono Cross), from the video game Chrono Cross
Marcie (Peanuts), in the Peanuts comic strip
Marcy D'Arcy, in the television series Married With Children
Marcie McBain, in the soap opera One Life to Live
Marcy Park, in the musical The 25th Annual Putnam County Spelling Bee
Marcy Wu, in the animated fantasy series Amphibia

Places

United States
Mount Marcy (New York), the highest mountain in New York
Marcy Hill, New York
Marcy, New York, a town
Marcy Houses, a housing project in Brooklyn
Marcy Correctional Facility, a prison in Marcy, New York
Marcy Avenue (BMT Jamaica Line), a station on the New York City Subway J/Z lines
Marcy Park (disambiguation), several parks
Marcy Field, a public-use airport south of Keene, New York
Marcy Brook, New York - see Marcy Dam

France
Marcy, Aisne, a commune
Marcy, Nièvre, a commune
Marcy, Rhône, a commune

Other
Marcy potato, a variety of hybrid potato developed in 1990
"Marcie", a track on Song to a Seagull, Joni Mitchell's debut album

See also
Marcia (given name)
Marcy-l'Étoile, Rhône
Marcy-sous-Marle, Aisne
Fort Marcy (disambiguation)
Marsi (disambiguation)